The Sainte-Maxime International Horror Film Festival is an annual horror film festival located in Sainte-Maxime, France. The yearly festival shows a wide variety of horror, fantasy and science fiction genre films including shorts, features and animated films. All French competitions are free to enter and any other competitions have a small fee, it is a festival advertised as open to many an array of different genres even branching away from horror, like fancy, musicals and comedy. It is used as opportunity for film creators to get exposure.

Featured Films

2009
The Human Centipede, Directed by Tom Six. A Dutch body horror about multiple tourists being kidnapped and sewn together into a centipede. Won Prix d'Or (golden) in ‘Official Competition’.
Murder Set Pieces, a horror about a serial killer photographer directed by Nick Palumbo. Won Prix d'Or (golden) ‘Midnight X-Treme Competition’.
Boob, directed by Honest, a comedy about a boob come to life. Won Prix d'Or (golden) in ‘International Short Films Competition’
Pogo & ses amis, directed by François Guay is a French comedy. Won Prix d'Or (golden) in ‘French Short Films Competition'.

Rules and Prizes

There are 3 winning categories for screenplays first, second and third.

The screenplays must be under 25 pages and the prizes for getting into the top 3 categories promises such things as money, being listed on their IHSFF website and luxuries such as VIP passes to other festivals. 
The top ten finalists will also have the opportunity to have their screenplays requested to producers.

References

4. PRODUCTION HUB, SAINTE MAXIME INTERNATIONAL HORROR FILM FESTIVAL, accessed 2021, https://www.productionhub.com/event/20124/sainte-maxime-international-horror-film-festival

5. Andrew Mack (2009),The Human Centipede' wins Prix D'or at Sainte Maxime International Horror Film Festival, accessed 2021, https://screenanarchy.com/2009/11/the-human-centipede-wins-prix-dor-at-sainte-maxime-international-horror-film-festival.html

6.IMDb,The Human Centipede (First Sequence), accessed 2021, https://www.imdb.com/title/tt1467304/

7.The international Horror SciFi (2021), SUBMISSIONS ARE NOW OPEN FOR 2022, accessed 2021, http://www.horrorscifi.com/submissions

External links

Film festivals in France
Fantasy and horror film festivals